The Eighth Nitish Kumar ministry is the Council of Ministers in Bihar Legislative Assembly headed by Chief Minister Nitish Kumar. On August 9, 2022, he walked out of the BJP's NDA alliance and announced his resignation. He then decided to form a new government in Bihar along with the RJD and the Congress. Though Nitish Kumar from Janata Dal (United) is the Chief Minister of this government, Rashtriya Janata Dal is the largest party in this alliance.

Council of Ministers 
Source:

See also 

 Government of Bihar
 Bihar Legistive Assembly
 Bihar Legistive Council
 List of chief minters of Bihar
 List of deputy chief minters of Bihar
 Sixth Nitish Kumar mintry
 Seventh Nitish Kumar mintry

References

Janata Dal (United)
Lists of current Indian state and territorial ministries
2022 in Indian politics
Bihar ministries
Nitish Kumar
2022 establishments in Bihar
Cabinets established in 2022
8
Rashtriya Janata Dal